The 1976–77 All-Ireland Senior Club Football Championship was the seventh staging of the All-Ireland Senior Club Football Championship since its establishment by the Gaelic Athletic Association in 1970–71.

St. Vincent's were the defending champions, however, they were beaten by Portlaoise in the second round of the Leinster Club Championship.

On 13 March 1977, Austin Stacks won the championship following a 1-13 to 2-07 defeat of Ballerin in the All-Ireland final at Croke Park. It remains their only championship title.

Results

Munster Senior Club Football Championship

First round

Semi-finals

Final

All-Ireland Senior Club Football Championship

Quarter-final

Semi-finals

Final

Championship statistics

Miscellaneous

 Killererin won the Connacht Club Championship title for the first time in their history.
 Ballerin won the Ulster Club Championship for the first time in their history.

References

1976 in Gaelic football
1977 in Gaelic football